Crashcarburn EP is the debut EP by South African rock band, Crashcarburn.

Track listing 
 "Broken Skyline"
 "Heroes"
 "Scarlet Letter"
 "For Every Star"
 "Sing This at my Wake"

Personnel
Garth Barnes – guitar, vocals
Mike Stott – guitar, backing vocals
Dylan Belton – guitar
Chris Brink – bass guitar, backing vocals
Brendan Barnes – drums

References

2006 debut EPs
Crashcarburn albums